Louis Newton Ury (1877 – March 4, 1918), nicknamed "Old Sheep", was a Major League Baseball first baseman during the end of the 1903 season.

He played in two games for the St. Louis Cardinals on September 9 and September 12, both at Robison Field in St. Louis. He did very well in the field, handling 24 chances without an error. At the plate, he went 1-for-7 for a .143 batting average.

One of his teammates on the 1903 Cardinals was Hall of Famer Mordecai "Three Finger" Brown.

Ury died at the age of 40 or 41 in Kansas City, Missouri.

External links

Retrosheet

1877 births
1918 deaths
St. Louis Cardinals players
Major League Baseball first basemen
Baseball players from Kansas
People from Fort Scott, Kansas
Minor league baseball managers
Dallas Giants players
Birmingham Barons players
Muskogee Redskins players
Pittsburg Pirates players
Kewanee Boilermakers players
Bartlesville Boosters players
Salina Insurgents players
Hugo Scouts players
Fort Scott Giants players